General Peyron may refer to:

Gustaf Oscar Peyron (1828–1915), Swedish Army lieutenant general
Henry Peyron (1883–1972), Swedish Army major general
Lennart Peyron (1909–1981), Swedish Air Force major general